Ernest Lee Steere (or Lee-Steere) may refer to:

Ernest Augustus Lee Steere (1866-1957)
Ernest Henry Lee-Steere (1912-2011)